Elisha Williams (born June 9, 1978) is a Canadian Paralympic wheelchair basketball player who won 2 silver medals in 2007 and 2011 respectively. In 2008 she was awarded with the British Columbia Premiere's Athletic Award and 5 years later got the Queen Elizabeth II Diamond Jubilee Medal.

References

1978 births
Living people
Basketball people from British Columbia
Paralympic wheelchair basketball players of Canada
Sportspeople from Prince George, British Columbia